Kusel is a district (Kreis) in the south of Rhineland-Palatinate, Germany. Neighboring districts are (from north-west clockwise) Birkenfeld, Bad Kreuznach, Donnersbergkreis, Kaiserslautern, Saarpfalz and Sankt Wendel (the last two belonging to the state of Saarland).

History
The district of Kusel was created at the beginning of the 19th century.  In 1939 it was renamed as Landkreis Kusel.  The boundary was altered slightly as part of the communal reform of 1969/72 with some parts of the district of Birkenfeld being added to Kusel.

Geography
The district of Kusel lies in the North Palatine Uplands (Nordpfälzer Bergland), to the north of the industrial areas of the Saarland. The largest rivers are the Lauter (also called the Waldlauter, to distinguish it from other rivers in German-speaking Europe named Lauter) and the Glan.

Coat of arms
The German blazon reads: Gespalten: Vorne in Schwarz ein linksgewendeter, rot bewehrter goldener Löwe, hinten in Silber ein rot bewehrter, blauer Löwe.

The district's arms might in English heraldic language be described thus: Per pale sable a lion rampant sinister Or armed and langued gules and argent a lion rampant azure armed and langued of the third.

The two charges, both lions, are both heraldic devices borne by former lords, the one on the dexter (armsbearer's right, viewer's left) side by the Counts of Veldenz and the one on the sinister (armsbearer's left, viewer's right) side by Electoral Palatinate, which acquired the area in the 15th century. The arms were approved on 13 December 1965.

Towns and municipalities

References

External links

Official website (German)

 
Districts of Rhineland-Palatinate